Ixora finlaysoniana is a species of shrub in the family Rubiaceae. It is native to Southeast Asia, China, NE India and Philippines.

References

finlaysoniana
Flora of Assam (region)
Flora of Bangladesh
Flora of China
Flora of the Philippines
Flora of Thailand